Dornipadu is a village in Dornipadu mandal, located in Nandyal district of the Indian state of Andhra Pradesh.

References 

Villages in Nandyal  district